Crescent Township is a township in Pottawattamie County, Iowa, USA.

History
Crescent Township is named from the shape of river bluffs along the Missouri River.

References

Townships in Pottawattamie County, Iowa
Townships in Iowa